Petrus Marie ("Piet") Soudyn (March 3, 1880 – September 18, 1946) was a Dutch track and field athlete who competed in the 1908 Summer Olympics. He was born and died in Rotterdam.

In 1908 he was eliminated in the first round of the 10 mile walk event.

References

External links
list of Dutch athletes

1880 births
1946 deaths
Dutch male racewalkers
Olympic athletes of the Netherlands
Athletes (track and field) at the 1908 Summer Olympics
Athletes from Rotterdam